Shamim Reza Rubel murder is a murder of private university student that took place in police custody and created a landmark legal case in Bangladesh.

History

Incident
Shamim Reza Rubel was a BBA student of Independent University, Bangladesh, a private university. On 23 July 1998 he was taken from his home in Siddeswari by undercover members of Detective Branch of Bangladesh Police who started beating him immediately and accused him of having illegal weapons. He was taken to the Detective Branch office in Mintu road. He was tortured in custody and forced to admit he had illegal weapons. They took him back to his house to recover the weapons but could not find any. Rubel admitted that he confessed to stop the torture. The continued to beat him and his screams could be heard in the neighborhood. He was taken back to the Detective Branch and there he died in custody. His autopsy report said he died from haemorrhage and shock caused by severe beating.

Case
In 1998 Human Rights organizations that challenged the power of Bangladesh Police to arbitrarily arrest people and torture them in custody. On 3 April 2003 the Bangladesh High Court issued a ruling that halted the governments ability to detain people under the Special Powers Act on mere suspicion. The Bangladesh Nationalist Party led government filed an appeal with the Appellate Division of the Supreme Court. On 24 May 2016 the Supreme court of Bangladesh upheld the High Court verdict with some modifications and significantly reduced the power of government to detain on suspicion.

Rubels father, Abdur Rob Miah, had filed a case against 14 people, including a neighbor of Rubel, Mukuli Begum. Another accused was Detective Branch assistant commissioner Akram Hussain who led the team that arrested Rubel. In June 2003 the court sentenced 13 of the accused to life in prison and Mukuli Begum to one year imprisonment. Bangladesh High Court on 5 May 2011 acquitted 11 of the 12 convicted, excluding police officer Hayatul Islam Thakur. Akram Hussain was defended by Serajul Huq. After Serajul Huq died, Hussain was defended by the son of Serajul Huq, who is the incumbent Minister of Law Anisul Huq. On 31 August 2015 the Supreme Court of Bangladesh asked Akram to surrender and allowed the government to file an appeal against the Bangladesh High Court verdict. This came after the government filled a petition against the verdict.

References

Murder in Bangladesh
July 1998 events in Asia
Legal history of Bangladesh
1998 murders in Bangladesh